Colville, a small town in the north of the Coromandel Peninsula in the North Island of New Zealand, lies 26 kilometres north of Coromandel in Colville Bay on the Hauraki Gulf, and is the northernmost town of any note on the peninsula. North of Colville, 28 kilometres of rough road lead to the small settlement of Port Jackson, close to the peninsula's northwesternmost point, Cape Colville and 20 km to Port Charles on the northeastern side.

The town is the service and social centre for the area, with a co-operatively-owned general store, Postal Delivery Centre, volunteer fire brigade, school, community hall and several houses. Just beyond the town is the beginning of the Te Moehau Range, which forms the bulk of the northern end of the Coromandel Peninsula, and contains valuable ecological areas, including a population of the threatened North Island brown kiwi.

Colville the town took its name from the cape, which Captain James Cook named on 18 November 1769 after Rear Admiral Lord Colville, under whom Cook had previously served (1759–1761) on HMS Northumberland in the Royal Navy.
Colville was also known as Cabbage Bay, thought to be in reference to the cabbage trees in the bay.

Colville township grew following the construction of a general store with a motor garage alongside. This was built by Richard (Dick) Goudie, a local man whose grandparents had settled in Cabbage Bay. Dick Goudie later ran a taxi service from the town, being the first to drive a motor vehicle across the new bridge at Papa Aroha which opened up the northern peninsula from Coromandel. Fossicking for semi-precious stones such as carnelian and for kauri gum are popular activities among tourists visiting the town.

Another member of the Goudie family, John, developed a motor camp a few kilometres north of the town some years later.

The Motukawao Islands lie five kilometres off the coast to the southwest of Colville, in the Hauraki Gulf.

Demographics
The SA1 area is part of the larger Colville  statistical area.

The SA1 statistical area had a population of 159 at the 2018 New Zealand census, an increase of 30 people (23.3%) since the 2013 census, and an increase of 42 people (35.9%) since the 2006 census. There were 66 households, comprising 78 males and 81 females, giving a sex ratio of 0.96 males per female. The median age was 51.9 years (compared with 37.4 years nationally), with 27 people (17.0%) aged under 15 years, 12 (7.5%) aged 15 to 29, 84 (52.8%) aged 30 to 64, and 36 (22.6%) aged 65 or older.

Ethnicities were 96.2% European/Pākehā, 9.4% Māori, 3.8% Pacific peoples, 1.9% Asian, and 1.9% other ethnicities. People may identify with more than one ethnicity.

Although some people chose not to answer the census's question about religious affiliation, 64.2% had no religion, 17.0% were Christian, 5.7% were Buddhist and 1.9% had other religions.

Of those at least 15 years old, 36 (27.3%) people had a bachelor's or higher degree, and 24 (18.2%) people had no formal qualifications. The median income was $21,000, compared with $31,800 nationally. 6 people (4.5%) earned over $70,000 compared to 17.2% nationally. The employment status of those at least 15 was that 51 (38.6%) people were employed full-time, 39 (29.5%) were part-time, and 3 (2.3%) were unemployed.

Colville statistical area
Colville statistical ara is much larger than the town, and covers the western side of the Coromandel Peninsula north of the Waikawau River and the entire area north of and including Kennedy Bay, but excludes Coromandel town.

Colville statistical area had a population of 1,485 at the 2018 New Zealand census, an increase of 195 people (15.1%) since the 2013 census, and an increase of 114 people (8.3%) since the 2006 census. There were 573 households, comprising 756 males and 729 females, giving a sex ratio of 1.04 males per female. The median age was 52.2 years (compared with 37.4 years nationally), with 231 people (15.6%) aged under 15 years, 171 (11.5%) aged 15 to 29, 714 (48.1%) aged 30 to 64, and 366 (24.6%) aged 65 or older.

Ethnicities were 75.6% European/Pākehā, 37.8% Māori, 2.8% Pacific peoples, 1.0% Asian, and 1.8% other ethnicities. People may identify with more than one ethnicity.

The percentage of people born overseas was 14.3, compared with 27.1% nationally.

Although some people chose not to answer the census's question about religious affiliation, 58.4% had no religion, 26.5% were Christian, 4.6% had Māori religious beliefs, 0.2% were Hindu, 1.4% were Buddhist and 2.6% had other religions.

Of those at least 15 years old, 189 (15.1%) people had a bachelor's or higher degree, and 285 (22.7%) people had no formal qualifications. The median income was $22,300, compared with $31,800 nationally. 117 people (9.3%) earned over $70,000 compared to 17.2% nationally. The employment status of those at least 15 was that 447 (35.6%) people were employed full-time, 270 (21.5%) were part-time, and 51 (4.1%) were unemployed.

Education

Notes

References

Thames-Coromandel District
Populated places in Waikato
Populated places around the Hauraki Gulf / Tīkapa Moana